Hypatima orthostathma is a moth in the family Gelechiidae. It was described by Edward Meyrick in 1921. It is found in Australia, where it has been recorded from Queensland.

The wingspan is about 9 mm. The forewings are grey, closely and suffusedly irrorated (sprinkled) with white, slightly tinged yellowish in places and with a brownish streak along the basal fourth of the costa with some blackish scales. There is a black dot on the dorsum at one-fourth and a semi-oval blackish spot on the middle of the costa, preceded and followed by slight blackish marks. There is also a direct transverse blackish fasciate streak from the dorsum beneath this, not reaching it and a small dark grey spot on the costa at two-thirds, a black longitudinal sometimes interrupted strigula in the disc at three-fourths and some greyish suffusion towards the termen, and two or three slight blackish marks. The hindwings are light grey.

References

Moths described in 1921
Hypatima
Taxa named by Edward Meyrick